Michelle Marinho Pavão (born 31 October 1986) is a Brazilian female volleyball player. She is part of the Brazil women's national volleyball team. On club level she played for BRASÍLIA VÔLEI in 2014. She often competes alongside her twin sister Monique.

Clubs
  Rio de Janeiro (2004–2005)
  Macaé Sports (2005–2007)
  Rio de Janeiro (2007–2010)
  Minas Tênis Clube (2010–2011)
  SESI-SP (2011–2012)
  Praia Clube (2012–2014)
  Brasília Vôlei  (2014–2015)
  Praia Clube (2015–2017)
  Fluminense FC (2017–2018)
  Praia Clube (2018–2021)
  Osasco/São Cristóvão Saúde (2021–)

Awards

Clubs
 2007–08 Brazilian Superliga –  Champion, with Rexona/Ades
 2008–09 Brazilian Superliga –  Champion, with Rexona/Ades
 2018–19 Brazilian Superliga –  Runner-Up, with Dentil/Praia Clube
 2020–21 Brazilian Superliga –  Runner-Up, with Dentil/Praia Clube
 2017 South American Club Championship –  Runner-up, with Dentil/Praia Clube
 2019 South American Club Championship –  Runner-up, with Dentil/Praia Clube
 2020 South American Club Championship –  Runner-up, with Dentil/Praia Clube

References

External links
 Profile at FIVB.org

1986 births
Living people
Brazilian women's volleyball players
Place of birth missing (living people)
Pan American Games medalists in volleyball
Universiade medalists in volleyball
Pan American Games silver medalists for Brazil
Wing spikers
Volleyball players at the 2015 Pan American Games
Universiade gold medalists for Brazil
Medalists at the 2011 Summer Universiade
Medalists at the 2015 Pan American Games
Volleyball players from Rio de Janeiro (city)